Barrio Sésamo (Sesame Neighborhood in English) was the Spanish co-production of the popular U.S. children's television series Sesame Street produced by Televisión Española and Sesame Workshop (formerly Children's Television Workshop) from 1979 to 2000. All American characters adopted Spanish names while for the title of the series a more appropriate Spanish name was chosen: barrio (Neighborhood) instead of Street (calle).

Ábrete Sésamo (1974-1978) 
Previously, from November 3, 1974 to March 29, 1978, segments of the American Sesame Street were simply acquired and dubbed into Spanish to be aired with the title Ábrete Sésamo (es. Open Sesame) as part of a program "container" called Un globo, dos globos, tres globos

Barrio Sésamo (1978-1988)

Season 1 (1978-1981) 
In 1978, (RTVE), Televisión Española and Children's Television Workshop (CTW) agreed the terms for a co-production, after years where RTVE simply aired the original Sesame Street dubbed segments. The new episodes included a 15 minute segment of dubbed footage, and another 15 minute segment of original footage.

Duncan Kenworthy (CTW) was in charge of the USA production and Enrique Nicanor was assigned by (TVE) as Director of the Spanish new show and designer of the two Spanish new original muppets "Caponata" and "Perezgil"

Caponata was a red, orange and yellow feathered hen with curly pink hair similar in height (2 meters) to Big Bird. Actress Emma Cohen was in charge of working inside the muppet body and providing the character's voice. Caponata has the psychology of a 6 years old girl, naïve and curious about everything.
Perezgil was a large green snail with round glasses and curly green hair. He was reader, writer, poet and advisor of everybody in the neighborhood. Actor Jesús Alcaide was in charge of working the muppet as well as providing its voice.

Human characters includes:

 Nisi: Juan Margallo, the bar owner
 Angela: Petra Martínez, Nisi's wife
 Braulio: Manolo Aleixandre and/or José Riesgo, the newsstand owner
 Manolo: Manolo Vallejo, the garage owner
 Carmen: Concha Goyanes
 Cuqui: Gabriel Fariza, the radio reporter
 Jose: Marcelo Rubal

American characters adopted Spanish names:
Bert: Blas
Ernie: Epi
Kermit the Frog: Gustavo, la rana
Grover: Coco
Cookie Monster:Triqui
Count von Count :El Conde Draco

Cancellation 
The First Bario Sésamo season was cancelled by the station (RTVE) in 1981 when the station denied the authors to keep their rights on the characters. An agreement had been reached where the authors granted full commercial rights to the station except the right to be mentioned as authors and the right to deny the use of the muppets for commercial advertising of carbonized drinks and unhealthy products for children, the same rights that Jim Henson kept with all his own characters. The station fired the first creators and banned the characters from appearing in the new season. The person responsible for the Children's Department at the station commissioning the American co-production company, CTW USA, to create and provide new "Spanish" muppets with new names. With that action, Barrio Sésamo was no longer a co-production with Spanish-created characters.

La Cometa Blanca (1981-1983) 
From 1981 to 1983, a different Televisión Española children's program, La Cometa Blanca, included some sketches from Sesame Street. This program was directed by Muppet fan Lolo Rico and featured some actors who would later appear in Barrio Sésamo, mainly Mari Luz Olier, Alfonso Vallejo and the child-actress Ruth Gabriel (then known as Ruth Abellán).

Seasons 2-4 (1983-1988) 
The Sesame Street sketches in La Cometa Blanca were so successful with their young audience that the Spanish-version was given another chance in 1983. Only José Riesgo as Julián returned from the first season. Caponata and Perezgil were replaced by two new Muppets totally designed, this time, and constructed by CTW. The main character was Espinete, a large pink hedgehog that replaced Caponata. Like Caponata, Espinete was a full-body Muppet and was the main character on the show, played by Chelo Vivares. He became famous for sleeping in pajamas in spite of being "naked" the rest of the day.

Other characters included:

Don Pimpón (Alfonso Vallejo): Another full-body Muppet. This farmer was an undetermined brown being, similar to a Sesame Street monster.
Chema (Juan Sánchez): The baker of Barrio Sésamo.
Ana (Isabel Castro): The young friend of everybody.
Don Julián (José Riesgo): The old owner of a mobile news stand.
Matilde (Mari Luz Olier) and Antonio (José Enrique Camacho): married owners of an horchata shop
Roberto (Roberto Mayor) and Ruth (Ruth Gabriel, as Ruth Abellán): Matilde and Antonio's children
In 1983, one year after the second season started, a new government won the elections in Spain and new officials were appointed as DG of RTVE (José Maria Calviño). The new staff fired those involved in the cancellation of the original series. The creator of the banned first season was called by the station and was appointed as new Head of the Children' Programmes Unit and later Director of the TVE-2 channel. 

The show finished around April 1988 and was replaced by Los Mundos de Yupi, a similar program fully produced by Televisión Española, featuring three extraterrestrial characters.

Barrio Sésamo revival (1996) 
In 1996, the show returned with new characters: Bluki (a blue full-body cat-like Muppet), Vera (a yellow monster), Bubo (an owl) and Gaspar (a human Muppet). Additional characters that made occasional appearances included a wild monster with red fur and a healthy appetite — portraying a role similar to Cookie Monster's — and a tan Anything Muppet that could be turned into characters (such as a baby, a girl friend of Vera's, a clumsy man with a moustache, or a pig).
The show's directors were:

Enrique Nicanor
Antonio Torets
Jose María Vidal (co-director)

Later Spanish dubs 
Since 2006, Juega Conmigo, Sésamo, the Castilian Spanish dub of Play with Me Sesame, has been broadcast on Antenna 3.

Since 2012, Super Healthy Monsters is a 5 to 7-minute series focuses on activities and foods that keep one healthy. Sesame Workshop produced 26 episodes in English, which initially aired dubbed in Spain on Antena 3 as a Barrio Sésamo mini-series called "Monstruos Supersanos."

On April 28, 2016, El Hotel Furchester, the Castilian Spanish dub of The Furchester Hotel, was broadcast in Spain on TVE Clan.

The show is part of the HBO programming in Spain under its original title, Sesame Street, with dubbed episodes of the HBO seasons from 2017 to 2021.

Episode list

List of 1980s series episodes
"La bicicleta" (6- 4-1983)
"Vamos a jugar" (7-4-1983) (7-11-1983)
"Dietética sana" (8-4-1983) (19-12-1983)
"El invento de Don Pimpón" (13-4-1983) (23-11-1983)
"Las cosquillas" (15-4-1983) (22-11-1983)
"El cubo" (20-4-1983)(20-12-1983)
"Fiesta de piñata" (21-4-1983)
"Hay que divertirse" (22-4-1983) (14-11-1983)
"La tortuga" (2-5-1983)
"Los mayores saben jugar" (3-5-1983)(2-9-1983)
"El plátano" (4-5-1983)(5-8-1983)
"El cumpleaños de Teresa" (5-5-1983)
"El juego" (6-5-1983)(9-2-1984)
"La familia Pelaez" (9-5-1983) (30-11-1983)
"La vaca" (10-5-1983)
"Los cubiertos" (11-5-1983) (1-8-1983) (30-1-1984)
"Socorro" (12-5-1983)
"Singular persecución" (13-5-1983) (7-12-1983)
"La familia Ortiz" (18-5-1983) (14-12-1983)
"Los sacos" (19-5-1983) (22-2-1984)(20-5-1987)
"La electricidad" (20-5-1983) (2-8-1983) (1-2-1984) (11-5-1987)
"El teatro" (25-5-1983) (25-7-1983)(11-1-1984) (2-7-1987)
"Inventando juegos" (19-7-1983)(21-12-1983)
"La imprenta de patata" (20-7-1983)(26-12-1983)
"Don Pimpón tiene calor" (21-7-1983)(9-1-1984)
"Singular persecución" (22-7-1983)(4-1-1984)
"La huerta de Julian" (27-7-1983) (18-1-1984) (7-7-1987)
"Viendo la televisión" (28-7-1983)
"Los gorros" (29-7-1983)
"El extranjero" (3-8-1983)
"La higiene del cuerpo" (4-8-1983) (6-2-1986)
"La bolera" (18-8-1983)
"Una tarde en casa" (30-8-1983) (22-2-1984)
"El enfado de Espinete" (31-8-1983)
"Los faroles" (1-9-1983)
"La cuerda" (20-10-1983)
"Bromas" (25-10-1983) (28-12-1983)
"El cohete de Espinete" (1-11-1983)
"La puerta" (2-11-1983)
"Verdad o mentira" (3-11-1983) (12-4-1984)
"El cuadro de Espinete" (4-11-1983) (26-4-1984)
"Son como niños" (8-11-1983) (11-4-1984)
"El día de la compra" (11-11-1983) (18-5-1984)
"La máquina" (16-11-1983)
"El mensaje secreto" (18-11-1983)
"El encantador de serpientes" (25-11-1983)
"Jugando al circo" (29-11-1983) (22-5-1984)
"La caseta" (28-11-1983)
"Espinete de La Mancha" (2-12-1983) (21-5-1984)
"El sillin nuevo" (5-12-1983)
"La película de Espinete" (8-12-1983) (27-4-1984)
"Espinete tiene hipo" (12-12-1983)
"La taquilla" (13-12-1983)
"El muñeco mecánico" (22-12-1983) (21-5-1984)
"Espinete y el bosque" (31-1-1984) (12-6-1984)
"La viejecita simpática" (16-2-1984)
"El gato" (20-2-1984)
"Jugando con palabras" (23-2-1984) (11-6-1984)
"El mural" (29-2-1984)
"Personajes famosos" (1-3-1984)
"La pelota se pincha" (5-3-1984)
"Mi zapato" (7-3-1984)
"Profesiones" (8-3-1984)
"Majo,Mimo,mago" (14-3-1984) (28-6-1984) (20-7-1987)
"El chatarrero" (15-3-1984) (26-6-1984)
"La riña de Espinete" (19-3-1984) (8-7-1984)
"Las bromas de Don Pimpón" (21-3-1984) (27-6-1984)
"La cometa" (29-3-1984)
"El sillon" (5-4-1984) (19-6-1984)
"Conozcamos a los animales" (10-4-1984)
"Que desbarajuste" (19-4-1984) (24-11-1987)
"Circuitos y Espinete" (20-4-1984)
"Qué cisco de circo" (8-6-1984)
"Espinete y el arbol del tesoro" (1-10-1984)
"Noche de reyes" (4-1-1985)
"La bola" (1-7-1985)
"Pregunta y acierta" (26-3-1986)
"Máquina de disfraces" (7-4-1986) (19-11-1986)
"Espinete lobo de mar" (14-4-1986) (13-11-1986) (1-2-1988)
"El globo de Espinete" (1-5-1986) (5-4-1988)
"La curiosidad de Espinete" (13-5-1986) (30-9-1986)
"Concurso de disfraces" (19-6-1986) (18-12-1986) (18-2-1988)
"Gambas con gabardina" (24-6-1896)
"Abrete Sésamo" (25-6-1986) (18-12-1986) (14-3-1988)
"La naranjada" (2-10-1986) (5-11-1986) (14-4-1988)
"Espinete domador" (8-10-1986) (4-12-1986) (25-1-1988)
"El mundo del reves y Espinete" (14-10-1986) (16-12-1986) (7-3-1988)
"El viaje de Espinete" (3-11-1986)
"Espinete bebé" (17-11-1986) (28-1-1988)
"No te manches" (26-11-1986) (28-3-1988)
"El hermano de Espinete" (9-12-1986) (11-2-1988)
"Espinete Superstar" (19-12-1986) (30-3-1988)
"El show de Barrio Sésamo" (1-1-1987)
"La inauguración" (8-1-1987)
"El guaperas" (13-1-1987)
"El vendedor ambulante" (11-2-1987)
"Visto y no visto" (13-2-1987)
"Los trogloditas" (19-2-1987)
"Llama que te llama" (23-2-1987)
"Los trogloditas atacan de nuevo" (9-3-1987)
"La banda y Espinete" (3-7-1987)
"El balón de Espinete" (1-10-1987)
"Espinete y el buzón" (5-10-1987)
"Los trucos de Espinete" (16-11-1987)
"El trabalenguas" (26-11-1987)
"Vivan los novios,Espinete" (1-12-1987)
"El tren de Espinete" (2-12-1987)
"Las palabras" (3-12-1987)
"Especiál navidad" (24-12-1987)
"Especial reyes" (5-1-1988)
"Espival de Sesamot" (6-1-1988)
"La amiga de Espinete" (7-1-1988)
"El hipnotizador y Espinete" (12-1-1988)
"Los sombreros" (13-1-1988)
"La bruja Piruja" (19-1-1988)
"El reloj de cuco" (20-1-1988)
"Don Pimpón y los piratas" (26-1-1988)
"El maharaja de Kapuratala" (27-1-1988)
"Ojo, mancha" (2-2-1988)
"Mama Momias" (3-2-1988)
"Espinete guardia urbano" (4-2-1988)
"El armario de luna" (9-2-1988)
"Gran jefe indio" (10-2-1988)
"El doctor Herborin" (16-2-1988)
"Espinete escayolado" (17-2-1988)
"Camúflate Espinete" (23-2-1988)
"Arroz para todos" (24-2-1988)
"El mono titiritero" (25-2-1988)
"El médico y Espinete" (2-3-1988)
"El hombre del maletin" (3-3-1988)
"El zoo de Espinete" (4-3-1988)
"Espinete quiere ser camarero" (8-3-1988)
"La máquina de los disfraces" (9-3-1988)
"Voy a navegar" (10-3-1988)
"Las pesas" (15-3-1988)
"Un día tranquilo" (16-3-1988)
"Con tenedor y cuchara" (17-3-1988)
"El grillo" (22-3-1988)
"Problemas con la decoración" (23-2-1988)
"Palomitas de maíz" (24-32-1988)
"Espinete y su grupete" (29-3-1988)
"La visita del medico" (30-3-1988)
"Bebe nuevo" (6-4-1988)
"Los sonámbulos" (7-4-1988)
"Las pintadas" (12-4-1998)
"Misterio en el bazar" (13-4-1988)

References

External links
Barrio Sésamo on Muppet Wiki

Barrio Sésamo episode 22 jan 1980

Sesame Street international co-productions
Television series with live action and animation
Spanish television shows featuring puppetry
1979 Spanish television series debuts
2000 Spanish television series endings
Spanish preschool education television series
1970s Spanish television series
RTVE shows
Spanish television series based on American television series